Schweyk in the Second World War (Schweyk im Zweiten Weltkrieg) is a play by German dramatist and poet Bertolt Brecht. It was written by Brecht in 1943 while in exile in California, and is a sequel to the 1923 novel The Good Soldier Švejk by Jaroslav Hašek.

Background 
Schweyk in the Second World War is set in Nazi-occupied Prague and on the Russian Front during World War II. In a summary written for potential composer Kurt Weill, it was written: "The Good Soldier Schweyk, after surviving the First World War, is still alive. Our story shows his successful efforts to survive the Second as well. The new rulers have even more grandiose and all-embracing plans than the old, which makes it even harder for today's Little Man to remain more or less alive." Hanns Eisler, ultimately, became Brecht's chief musical collaborator for the work.

Plot 
As Schweyk is forced into war, he manages to survive while overcoming dangerous situations in Gestapo Headquarters, a military prison, and a Voluntary Labor Service. The ending finds Schweyk lost in a snowstorm near Stalingrad. He meets an equally lost and bewildered Hitler, whose path is blocked by snow, frozen corpses, the Soviet Army, and the German people. Finally, Hitler does a grotesque dance and disappears into the snow.

TV production
Portuguese TV made an adaptation in 1975
IMDB link'

Stage production 
Schweyk in the Second World War was not staged during the lifetime of its writer Brecht, though it has been staged innumerable times across the world in various languages, including Bengali, since its 1957 premiere in Warsaw. 

The National Theatre in London staged a major revival directed by Richard Eyre with the same company of actors he had directed in his famous 1982 production of Guys and Dolls. 

Red Theater Chicago staged it in October 2012  starring Kevin Cox. It was directed by Aaron Sawyer with original music composed by Michael Evans. 

Forum Three Bangalore staged it for the first time in September 2014 in Bangalore and later at Auroville for an international audience. Directed by Ranjon Ghoshal, the original music recreating the Eastern European melodies of the 1940s was composed by Sudipto Das, with Sihi Kahi Chandru playing Schweyk.

See also
List of plays with anti-war themes

References

Bibliography 
 Calabro, Tony, Bertolt Brecht's Art of Dissemblance, Longwood Academic, 1990

Plays by Bertolt Brecht
1943 plays
Prague in fiction
The Good Soldier Švejk
Adaptations of works by Jaroslav Hašek